Angiolini is an Italian surname. Notable people with the surname include:

 Ambra Angiolini (born 1977), Italian TV host and singer in the 1990s
 Elish Angiolini (born 1960), Scottish lawyer
  (1776—1817), Italian dancer, one of the first who raised on pointes 
 Francesco Angiolini (1750–1788), Jesuit scholar
 Gasparo Angiolini (1731–1803), Italian dancer and choreographer and composer
 Napoleone Angiolini (1797–1871), Italian painter
 Renato Angiolini (1923–1985), Italian songwriter and pianist
 Sandro Angiolini (1920–1985), Italian comics creator

Italian-language surnames